William Owens or Bill Owens may refer to:

People

William Owens (Canadian politician) (1840–1917), Canadian politician
William Claiborne Owens (1849–1925), American politician
Oscar Owens (William Oscar Owens, 1893–1960), American baseball player
Bill Owens (baseball) (1901–1999), Negro league baseball player
William A. Owens (1905–1990), American author
Bill Owens (Massachusetts politician) (born 1937), American politician
Bill Owens (photographer) (born 1938), American photographer, brewer and editor
William Owens (admiral) (born 1940), United States Navy admiral and businessman
William C. Owens Jr. (born 1947), American politician
Bill Owens (New York politician) (born 1949), American politician
Bill Owens (Colorado politician) (born 1950), American politician
Billy Owens (American football) (born 1965), American football player
Billy Owens (born 1969), African-American basketball player
William Owens (Navy SEAL) (1980–2017), United States Navy SEALs senior chief petty officer
Bill Owens (songwriter) (1935-2021), American country music songwriter.

Characters
Captain Bill Owens, fictional character, Fantastic Voyage
Billy Owens, main character of The Mystical Adventures of Billy Owens and its sequel, Billy Owens and the Secret of the Runes

See also
William Owen (disambiguation)
Will Owen (disambiguation)
Bill Owen (disambiguation)